Elaine Stritch: Shoot Me is a 2013 American documentary film directed by Chiemi Karasawa about the life and career of Elaine Stritch.  Alec Baldwin and Broadway producer Cheryl Wiesenfeld served as executive producers on the film. It opened in theaters on 21 February 2014, shortly before Stritch's death in July 2014.

Karasawa and crew began following Stritch in 2011, she was 86 at the time.

Subjects
In addition to Stritch, several of her close friends and collaborators were featured in the film:

Alec Baldwin
Rob Bowman
Tina Fey
James Gandolfini
Paul Iacono
Cherry Jones
Julie Keyes
Nathan Lane
Tracy Morgan
Harold Prince
John Turturro
George C. Wolfe

The film was also dedicated to the memory of Gandolfini, who died before it was released.

Release
The film had limited release in US theaters on 21 February 2014.

It has been released to video on demand and was later available on Netflix.

Reception
Elaine Stritch: Shoot Me holds a 99% rating at Rotten Tomatoes from 67 reviews, with an average score of 7.89/10. The critical consensus reads: "Brutally honest and utterly compelling, Elaine Stritch: Shoot Me offers a riveting, vanity-free portrait of its legendary subject while offering a few essential truths about the human condition."

Jake Coyle of The Associated Press called it "an irresistibly entertaining documentary that captures Stritch during what she unsentimentally calls 'almost post-time.' After seven decades performing in New York — on Broadway, in countless cabaret nights at the Cafe Carlyle — Stritch's enormous energy has been knocked by the increasing years, diabetes, and surgeries on her hip and eyes. But Shoot Me, made over the last few years, is a document not of Stritch's dwindling, but of her feisty persistence."

References

External links 

 
 

2013 films
2013 documentary films
American documentary films
Documentary films about actors
Documentary films about singers
Films shot in New York City
Documentary films about women in music
Films scored by Kris Bowers
2010s English-language films
2010s American films